The Philippi Horticultural area is a large semi-urban semi-rural area of Philippi in Cape Town's Cape Flats region, in the Western Cape province of South Africa. The horticultural area is sparsely populated compared to the surrounding city and contains many farms. The 2011 national census recorded 6,618 residents living in the area with an additional 2,961 residents living in the Knole Park community in the central western part of the area.

History
Prior to European settlement in the 1600s nomadic Khoi and San used the land for grazing their animals and hunting for food. The first recorded community of local residents in the Philippi area was in 1833 during which time it was known as "Die Duine" (The Dunes). The Philippi Germans arrived in Cape Town (most of whom originated from the Lüneburger Heide region of Germany) in three groups between 1860 and 1883, and became known for their ability to grow vegetables in the sandy soils of the Cape Flats.

Economy 
The Philippi Horticultural Area provides up to 80% of Cape Town's fresh produce. It hosts 38 farms, 20 of which focus on the cultivation of horticultural products and 11 on livestock and animal products. Continuing urban development within the horticultural area has been controversial amid concerns that it will have a negative impact on food sustainability within Cape Town broadly. The area's agricultural activities generate R484 million of economic output annually.

References 

Townships in the Western Cape
Suburbs of Cape Town